Uh or UH may refer to:

Education
United Hospitals, medical schools in London, UK
University of Hartford
University of Hasselt
University of Havana
University of Hawaiʻi system
University of Hawaiʻi at Mānoa, its flagship university
University of Heidelberg
University of Helsinki
University of Hertfordshire
University of Houston
University of Huddersfield
University of Hyogo

Places
 An alternative name for U, Pohnpei (Micronesia)
 Uherské Hradiště, Czech Republic
 Upper Hutt, New Zealand
 Uzh, a river in Ukraine and Slovakia (Uh is the Slovak name)

Other uses
 A discourse marker indicating speech disfluency, also spelled er variously pronounced  or 
 University Hospitals, a network of hospitals and physicians in Cleveland, Ohio
 Ukrainian hryvnia, a currency
 Unang Hirit, a Philippine morning show
 Utility helicopter